I Heart Shakey is a family comedy live action feature film. The story is about a widower, his 10-year-old daughter and their dog, Shakey. The family moves from the smaller city of Toledo, Ohio to the big city of Chicago.  Upon arriving, they discover that they cannot keep their dog and must find him a new home. The film stars Steve Lemme, Steve Guttenberg, Beverly D'Angelo, and Alfonso Arau.

Plot
TBA

Cast
Steve Lemme as J.T. O'Neil
Steve Guttenberg as Stubbs
Beverly D'Angelo as Sheila
Alfonso Arau as Raoul
Rylie Behr as Chandler O'Neil
Philippe Brenninkmeyer as Mattias Ober
Michael Yurchak as Flavio
Dante Brown as Andrew
Sean Giambrone as Toledo Kid #3
Dusan Brown as Dash

Production
TBA

Reception
TBA

References

External links 
 
 
 

2012 films
Films about dogs
American comedy films
2012 comedy films
2010s English-language films
2010s American films